Lazar Čordašić (born 21 January 1988) is a Serbian football midfielder who plays for IMT.

Club career
He has started at Teksilac, club from Odžaci. After season and half, he moved to BSK Borča, but he played only 1 league match for this club. He had been sent on loan at Mladost Apatin, and later he returned to Tekstilac, on loan, too. After end of loan, he stayed in Tekstilac. In 2010, as a captain of Tekstilac, he was nominated for the best sportsman in Odžaci. During the winter break of the 2010–11 season, he joined in Donji Srem, which won the league in rest of season. After playing with Inđija, Proleter Novi Sad and OFK Odžaci, Čordašić joined Radnički Pirot at the beginning of 2017.

References

External links
 Lazar Čordašić stats at utakmica.rs
 
 

1988 births
Living people
Footballers from Osijek
Serbs of Croatia
Association football midfielders
Serbian footballers
FK BSK Borča players
FK Mladost Apatin players
FK Donji Srem players
FK Inđija players
FK Proleter Novi Sad players
FK Radnički Pirot players
FK TSC Bačka Topola players
FK Dinamo Pančevo players
FK IMT players
Serbian First League players
Serbian SuperLiga players